Tone Schwarzott (born 9 January 1941) is a Norwegian actress and poet. She was born in Porsgrunn. She made her stage debut at Nationaltheatret in 1963, and was assigned with this theatre until 2002. She has also performed for Fjernsynsteatret and Radioteatret. Among films she participated in are 3 from 1971, Marikens bryllup from 1972, and Hard Asphalt from 1986. She made her literary debut in 1965 with the poetry collection Veien til mitt hus, and published eight more collections during the 1970s.

External links

References

1941 births
Living people
People from Porsgrunn
Norwegian stage actresses
Norwegian film actresses
Norwegian women poets
20th-century Norwegian actresses
20th-century Norwegian women writers
21st-century Norwegian actresses
20th-century Norwegian poets